Prem may refer to:

People

Given name
 Prem (film director) (born 1978), film director and actor in Kannada films
 Prem Bahadur Kansakar (1918–1991), Nepalese politician and activist
 Prem Bahadur Singh, Nepalese politician
 Prem Bhatia (disambiguation), several people
 Prem Chand Gupta (born 1950), Indian politician
 Prem Chand Pandey (born 1945), Indian scientist and academic
 Prem Chopra (born 1935), actor in Hindi and Punjabi films
 Prem Chowdhry (born 1944), Indian social scientist, historian, and feminist
 Prem Das Rai (born 1954), Indian politician
 Prem Dhillon, Indian singer and songwriter
 Prem Dhawan, lyricist
 Prem Dhoj Pradhan (1938–2021), Nepalese musician
 Prem Jayanth (1931–1997), Sri Lankan actor, producer, and artist
 Prem Joshua, German musician, active since 1991
 Prem Kaur (fl. 1822–1843), wife of Sikh ruler Sher Singh
 Prem Khandu Thungan (born 1946), Indian politician
 Prem Kishore Patakha (born 1943), Hindi language poet
 Prem Krishen, Indian actor and producer, son of Prem Nath, active since 1981
 Prem Krishna Khanna (1894–1993), Indian revolutionary
 Prem Kumar (footballer) (born 1989), Indian footballer
 Prem Kumar (Kannada actor), (born 1976), Indian film actor, most popular for his Kannada films during the 2000s
 Prem Kumar (Malayalam actor) (born 1966), Indian film actor, most popular for his Malayalam films during the 1990s
 Prem Kumar (Tamil actor), actor in Tamil films, active since 1996
 Prem Kumar Dhumal (born 1944), Indian politician
 Prem Kumar Sharma (fl. 1993), Indian politician
 Prem Lal Singh, Nepalese politician
 Prem Lata Sharma, Indian musicologist, scholar, and educator
 Prem Mathur (fl. 1947–1949), first female Indian commercial pilot
 Prem Maya Sonir (born 1961), Indian hockey player and coach
 Prem Menon (actor), actor and director in Tamil films
 Prem Nath (1916–1992), actor in Hindi films
 Prem Nath Dogra (died 1972), Indian leader
 Prem Nath Thapar (1903–1969), Indian civil servant
 Prem Nawas (fl. 1952–1980), actor and producer of Malayalam films
 Prem Nazir (1926–1989), actor in Malayalam films
 Prem Panicker, Indian cricket journalist
 Prem Parkash (born 1932), Indian author
 Prem Prakash, actor and producer in Malayalam films, active since 1968
 Prem Purachatra (1915–1981), prince of Thailand
 Ngarmchit Prem Purachatra (1915–1983), princess of Thailand
 Prem Radhakishun (born 1962), Dutch-Surinamese lawyer, columnist, actor, and producer
 Prem Raj, Indian film director
 Prem Rakshith, choreographer
 Prem Ram Dubey (1933–2012), Indian Kosal State separatist
 Prem Rawat (born 1957), Indian religious leader
 Prem Reddy (born 1948), Indian-American cardiologist and major owner of Prime Healthcare Services
 Prem Sahgal (1917–1992), officer of the British Indian Army and Indian National Army
 Prem Shankar Jha (born 1938), Indian newspaper editor
 Prem Sikka, British professor of accounting
 Prem Singh (Fijian politician) (fl. 2001–2002), member of the Fijian parliament
 Prem Singh Brahma (1952–2007), Indian Bodo separatist and politician
 Prem Singh Chandumajra (born 1950), Indian politician
 Prem Singh Dhami, Nepalese politician and minister
 Prem Suri, Jain religious teacher
 Prem Tinsulanonda (1920—2019), Thai military officer, Prime Minister of Thailand from 1980 to 1988
 Prem Watsa (born 1950), founder, chairman, and chief executive of Fairfax Financial Holdings, based in Toronto, Ontario

Surname
 Aneeta Prem, British author, human rights campaigner, and magistrate
 Heimrad Prem (1934–1978), German painter
 Krishna Prem (1898–1965), British-Indian spiritual teacher
 Rohan Prem (born 1986), Indian cricketer

Places
 Prem, Bavaria, Germany
 Prem, Ilirska Bistrica, Slovenia

Other uses
 Prem (film), a 1995 Hindi film
 Prem (food), a brand of canned meat
 Prem (Hinduism), a concept of elevated love
 Premature birth, in humans, the birth of a baby of less than 37 weeks gestational age
 Preliminary Reference Earth Model, a commonly used 1 D reference model for the structure of the Earth
 Premier League, the top association football league in England

See also
 
 Prema (disambiguation)
 Premie (disambiguation)